László Hódi (16 April 1912 – 18 November 1990) was a Hungarian diver. He was born in Budapest. He competed at the 1936 Summer Olympics in Berlin, where he placed 11th in 10 metre platform, and 22nd in springboard.

References

External links

1912 births
1990 deaths
Divers from Budapest
Hungarian male divers
Olympic divers of Hungary
Divers at the 1936 Summer Olympics
Sportspeople from Budapest
20th-century Hungarian people